The Ford GPA "Seep" (Government 'P' Amphibious, where 'P' stood for its 80-inch wheelbase), with supply catalog number G504, was an amphibious version of the World War II Ford GPW jeep. 

Design features of the much larger and successful DUKW amphibious 2-ton truck were used on the GPA, but unlike these and the jeep, the 'seep' was not a successful design. It was considered too slow and heavy on land, and lacked sufficient seagoing abilities in open water, due mainly to its low freeboard.

The Soviet Union received roughly half of the total GPA production under Lend Lease, and were sufficiently satisfied with its ability to cross calmer inland waters, that they produced a copy, the GAZ-46.

History and development

After having commissioned Willys, Ford and Bantam to build the first 4,500 jeeps (1500 each) in March 1941, the US Motor Transport Board set up a project under the direction of the National Defense Research Committee (NDRC) to be designated "QMC-4 1/4 Ton Truck Light Amphibian".

Roderick Stephens Jr. of Sparkman & Stephens Inc. yacht designers was asked to design a shape for a  amphibious jeep, in the same vein as his design for the DUKW six-wheel-drive amphibious truck. Stephens' hull design looked like a miniature version of that of the DUKW, and just like it, the 'Seep' was going to have a screw propeller, driven by a power take-off, operating in a dedicated tunnel faired into the rear end bodywork, as well as a proper rudder.

The construction of the vehicle was developed in competition by Marmon-Herrington and Ford Motor Company. Marmon-Herrington specialized in all-wheel-drive vehicles. The Marmon-Herrington prototype's hull formed an integral unibody structure, created by cutting shapes out of steel sheet and welding those together. The Ford entry, however, used a sturdy chassis and internal frame, to which more or less regular automobile type sheet-steel was welded. This construction made the GPA some  lighter than its competitor. The GPA's design was based on the Willys MB and Ford GPW standard Jeeps as much as possible, using many of the same parts. The GPA had an interior similar to that of the MB/GPW jeeps, although the driver's compartment had almost twice as many control levers: 2WD/4WD, hi-range/lo-range, capstan winch (on the bows), propeller deployment and rudder control. After a direct comparison of the two companies' prototypes, Ford received a contract for production starting in 1942.

Service

In contrast to the DUKW, the GPA did not perform well in the field. At some  the production truck had become much heavier than the original  specified in the design brief, but its volume had not been increased accordingly. As a consequence, a low freeboard in the water meant that the GPA could not handle more than a light chop or carry much cargo. The GPA's intended use of ferrying troops and cargo from ships off-shore, over a beach and continuing inland, was therefore very limited. 

On land, the vehicle was too heavy and its body too unwieldy to be popular with the soldiers. GPAs would frequently get stuck in shallow waters, where the regular Willys MB's water fording abilities allowed it to drive straight through. Production was already halted in March 1943 after production of only 12,778 vehicles due to financial quibbles between Ford and the US government, as well as bad reception of the vehicle in theatre. Although some sources state that less than half of that number were ever completed , serial numbers of surviving specimens suggest that the figure of around 12,700 is actually correct.

GPAs participated in the Sicily landings of September 1943 after a small number were used in action earlier in North Africa. Some also saw service the Pacific theater. Under the Lend-Lease programme, some 4,486 GPAs were sent to US Allies. The largest recipients were the Soviet Union which received 3,520 and the British Commonwealth which received 852 GPAs.

Postwar
The USSR developed a derivative of the GPA after the war. The GAZ-46 MAV, which closely resembled the GPA, entered production in 1952. The GAZ-46 was exported to many  USSR-allied countries. 

GPAs were also sold as surplus and were purchased by farmers, ranchers, adventurers and others. By the 1970s, collectors had discovered them, and started restoring them back to their original specifications. They appear at various military vehicle shows.

Half-Safe and other conversions

After World War II, several adventurers converted surplus GPAs into world-travelling machines.

The most famous one was during the 1950s when Australian Ben Carlin (1912–1981) sailed and drove a modified Seep, that he called "Half-Safe" on a journey around the world.

A young American couple, Helen and Frank Schreider, converted one which they called "La Tortuga" and traveled from Los Angeles to the Southern tip of South America (1954–1956). They later converted another one called "Tortuga II" which they used on National Geographic expeditions in India (1959) and Indonesia (1961).

World War II British paratrooper veteran Lionel Force purchased a GPA from Levy's Surplus in Toronto, Ontario, Canada, and called it "The Amphib". Among many changes, he grafted on a roof from a Dodge station wagon and lengthened the hull at the stern. He used the top halves of the doors, but knowing that he might be tied up alongside a dock, he added a round roof hatch. He planned to travel from Toronto to England via the US, Mexico, Guatemala, Panama, South America including Brazil, Africa, the Middle East, Greece and up to England. He got as far as Panama but turned back when he learned that the freighter upon which he intended to ship "The Amphib" from Brazil to Africa had been taken out of service.

See also
 Volkswagen Schwimmwagen - German World War II - based on the Kübelwagen.
 FMC XR311
 G-numbers (G-504)

Notes

References
 TM 9-1263
 TM 10-1264 Parts List
 René Pohl: Mit dem Auto baden gehen. HEEL Verlag, Gut-Pottscheidt Konigswinter 1998, 
 Ben Carlin, Half Safe, Across the Atlantic by Jeep, Andre Deutsch (London), 1955
 Ben Carlin, The Other Half of Half-Safe, Guildford Grammar School Foundation 1989,

External links

 Olive Drab
 Picture of a Ford GPA in Sicily in 1943
  "This Jeep Can Swim" ,June 1943, Popular Science

Amphibious military vehicles
World War II vehicles of the United States
Motor vehicles manufactured in the United States
GPA
Amphibious vehicles of World War II
Military vehicles introduced from 1940 to 1944